Maccheroni alla molinara  or alla mugnaia  (Abruzzese dialect) is an uneven, long and thick fresh pasta that is hand-pulled to a diameter of about 4–6 mm.

Preparation 
It is made using only water and durum wheat flour. The name literally translates to "the miller’s wife’s pasta". The pasta is characteristic of the province of Teramo and Pescara in the Abruzzo, Italy.

These are manufactured by working the dough until it gets a hole in its center. The process requires trained hands that, facing one another, are able to slip into the hole to knead the dough in a circle, and gradually lengthening the ring to get a long noodle. This is then cut to length, generally about twice as long as a normal spaghetti, or served as one giant noodle loop with up to 10 meters in length.

This pasta remains relatively unknown since it is typically served only in homes and at festivals, and it represents a dying trait even in Abruzzo.

History 
The history of this pasta dates back to the 14th century coinciding with the construction of watermills on the river Fino. Back then it was presented to King Robert of Naples when he visited the area.

References

Cuisine of Abruzzo
Types of pasta